Rudonja is a Slovenian surname. Notable people with the surname include:

Mladen Rudonja (born 1971), Slovenian footballer
Roy Rudonja (born 1995), Slovenian footballer, son of Mladen

See also
Radonja

Slovene-language surnames